Desure Buie (born February 21, 1997) is an American professional basketball player for the Rio Grande Valley Vipers of the NBA G League. He played college basketball for Hofstra.

Early life and high school career
Buie attended Wings Academy in Bronx, New York. As a senior, he averaged 17.1 points per game and led New York City in assists. Buie was a New York State Class AA First Team selection and a Daily News and MSG Varsity First Team All-New York City honoree, and he led Wings to the New York City Public Schools Athletic League (PSAL) and State Federation championship. He played AAU basketball alongside future Hofstra teammate Eli Pemberton. He was regarded as a three-star recruit and committed to Hofstra. Buie nearly did not qualify academically for college, having to finish his high school career with strong grades.

College career
As a freshman at Hofstra, Buie averaged 3.0 points, 1.4 assists, and 1.0 rebound per game as a backup point guard. He struggled with his academics, clashing with a writing professor, but ultimately viewed her class as a challenge. He tore his ACL eight games into his sophomore season and was forced to redshirt, averaging 2.8 points, 1.4 rebounds and 2.1 assists per game. As a redshirt sophomore, Buie became the starter halfway into the season, replacing Kenny Wormley, and helped the team finish third in the CAA. He finished the season averaging 6.4 points, a team-leading 3.3 assists and 1.5 rebounds per game.

On February 23, 2019, Buie scored eight points and had a career-high 12 assists in a 104–99 overtime loss to James Madison. Buie was named CAA Co-Defensive Player of the Year as a junior alongside teammate Justin Wright-Foreman and helped Hostra win the regular-season championship. He averaged 10.7 points, 5.2 assists, 2.7 rebounds, and 2.3 steals per game, and also earned Third Team All-CAA honors. On January 4, 2020, Buie scored a career-high 44 points in a 102–75 win over Elon, shooting 6-of-8 from behind the three-point arc. As a senior, Buie averaged 18.2 points, 5.9 assists, 3.7 rebounds, and 2.0 steals per game. He helped Hofstra win the CAA regular season and tournament titles and was named tournament MVP, as well as earning First Team All-CAA honors. He was one of 30 finalists for the Senior CLASS award, and was named First Team All-Met. Buie scored 29 points in the CAA championship victory over Northeastern, but the NCAA Tournament was cancelled due to the COVID-19 pandemic, forcing Buie to practice in a New York gymnasium. He finished his Hofstra career as the program leader in games played with 141, 18th in scoring (1,310), fourth in assists (548), and sixth in steals (203).

Professional career

ZZ Leiden (2020) 
On July 30, 2020, Buie signed his first professional contract with ZZ Leiden of the Dutch Basketball League (DBL). He played two games for Leiden, averaging 16.5 points, 5 rebounds and 7 assists per game. On October 16, Leiden announced that Buie opted out of his contract. Due to the increasing number of infections of the COVID-19 pandemic in the Netherlands, Buie preferred to return to the United States.

Rio Grande Valley Vipers (2021) 
Buie signed with the Rio Grande Valley Vipers of the NBA G League during the 2020–21 season.

BKM Lučenec (2021-2022) 
Buie signed with the MBK Lučenec of the Nike SBL.

Personal life
In 2016, Buie's daughter Jada was born. Buie earned his undergraduate degree in linguistics in 2019 with a 3.32 grade point average, becoming the first member of his family to graduate from college. He received his master's degree in higher education leadership in 2020.

References

External links
Hofstra Pride bio
Twitter

1997 births
Living people
American men's basketball players
American expatriate basketball people in the Netherlands
Basketball players from New York City
B.S. Leiden players
Dutch Basketball League players
Hofstra Pride men's basketball players
Point guards
Rio Grande Valley Vipers players
Sportspeople from the Bronx
ZZ Leiden players